The 1997 Central Michigan Chippewas football team represented Central Michigan University in the Mid-American Conference (MAC) during the 1997 NCAA Division I-A football season. In their fourth season under head coach Dick Flynn, the Chippewas compiled a 2–9 record (1–7 against MAC opponents), finished in fifth place in the MAC's West Division, and were outscored by their opponents, 479 to 282. The team played its home games in Kelly/Shorts Stadium in Mount Pleasant, Michigan, with attendance of 94,162 in five home games.

The team's statistical leaders included Tim Crowley with 2,204 passing yards, Eric Flowers with 909 rushing yards, and Reggie Allen with 877 receiving yards. Offensive guard Rollie Ferris was selected as the team's most valuable player.

Schedule

Roster

References

Central Michigan
Central Michigan Chippewas football seasons
Central Michigan Chippewas football